Presidential elections was held in Zimbabwe on 16 and 17 March 1996. The elections were contested by the incumbent President Robert Mugabe, Zimbabwe Rhodesia-era Prime Minister Abel Muzorewa, and ZANU–Ndonga leader Ndabaningi Sithole. Mugabe won, claiming over 90% of the vote, though turnout was just 32.3%, largely as a result of Sithole and Muzorewa withdrawing their candidacies shortly before the election (though their names remained on the ballot) due to threats of violence.

The elections were not free and fair, as the ruling Mugabe regime and ZANU-PF party engaged in extensive electoral manipulation. The election took place amid an economic crisis.

Sithole (who was under virtual house arrest due to charges of attempting to assassinate Mugabe) withdrew after claiming that Mugabe's ZANU–PF was undermining his campaign, whilst Muzorewa pulled out after the Supreme Court turned down his bid to postpone the elections on the basis that the electoral rules were unfair (as state funds were only available to parties with 15 or more seats in parliament). In December 1997 Sithole was convicted of conspiring to assassinate Mugabe; he appealed but died whilst out on bail.

Results

References

Presidential elections in Zimbabwe
Zimbabwe
1996 in Zimbabwe